Igor Ivanovich Bychkov (19 April 1958 in Cheboksary, Chuvash ASSR – 8 June 2009) is a Russian professional football coach and a former player. He won the 1977 FIFA World Youth Championship with the Soviet Union national under-20 football team and was later awarded the Soviet title of Master of Sports.

References

External links
 
 CSKA career summary by cska-games.ru

1958 births
2009 deaths
People from Cheboksary
Soviet footballers
PFC CSKA Moscow players
Soviet expatriate footballers
Expatriate footballers in East Germany
Russian football managers
FC Khimki managers
Association football midfielders
FC Iskra Smolensk players
Sportspeople from Chuvashia